Leo Zippin (1905 – May 11, 1995) was an American mathematician.  He is best known for solving Hilbert's Fifth Problem with Deane Montgomery and Andrew M. Gleason in 1952.

Biography
Leo Zippin was born in 1905 to Bella Salwen and Max Zippin, who had emigrated to New York City from the Ukraine in 1903. He did his undergraduate and graduate work at the University of Pennsylvania in 1929. His doctoral adviser was John Robert Kline.

Leo Zippin is the author of The Uses Of Infinity, and together with Deane Montgomery, the monograph Topological Transformation Groups. In 1952, he, along with Andrew M. Gleason and Deane Montgomery solved Hilbert's fifth problem.

Personal life
He married Frances Levinson in 1932.  They had two children, Nina, a prominent literary critic and literary historian, and Vivian.  He taught at Queens College in Flushing, NY.

References

External links

1905 births
1995 deaths
University of Pennsylvania alumni
20th-century American mathematicians
Topologists
Geometers
Queens College, City University of New York faculty
Scientists from New York City
Mathematicians from New York (state)